Milan Kučera (born 18 June 1974 in Jilemnice) is a former Czech nordic combined skier who competed from 1991 to 2002. Competing in four Winter Olympics, his best finish was fifth in the 15 km individual event at Nagano in 1998.

Kučera's best finish at the FIS Nordic World Ski Championships was fourth in the 15 km individual at Thunder Bay, Ontario in 1995. His only World Cup victory was in a 15 km individual event in France in 1998.

He is son of another Czech skier Tomáš Kučera.

References
 Profile at Sports-Reference.com
 

1974 births
Nordic combined skiers at the 1992 Winter Olympics
Nordic combined skiers at the 1994 Winter Olympics
Nordic combined skiers at the 1998 Winter Olympics
Nordic combined skiers at the 2002 Winter Olympics
Czech male Nordic combined skiers
Living people
Olympic Nordic combined skiers of Czechoslovakia
Czechoslovak male Nordic combined skiers
Olympic Nordic combined skiers of the Czech Republic
People from Jilemnice
Sportspeople from the Liberec Region